Vallecrosia ( or ) is a comune (municipality) in the Province of Imperia in the Italian region Liguria, located about  southwest of Genoa and about  west of Imperia. It is next to the busy city of Ventimiglia.  
 
Vallecrosia borders the following municipalities: Bordighera, Camporosso, San Biagio della Cima, and Vallebona.

History 
On 21 April 1686, the representants of eight villages, Camporosso, Vallebona, Vallecrosia, San Biagio della Cima, Sasso, Soldano, Borghetto San Nicolò and Bordighera had a meeting in order to build what they called "Magnifica Comunità degli Otto Luoghi", which can be translated as: "The magnificent community of the eight villages". Their goal was to gain independence from the nearby rival city of Ventimiglia.

References

External links

 Official website

Cities and towns in Liguria